Brenda Petzold (born August 6, 1973) is an American freestyle skier. She was born in Lawrence, Massachusetts. She competed at the 2002 Winter Olympics in Salt Lake City, in women's aerials.

References

External links 
 

1973 births
People from Lawrence, Massachusetts
Living people
American female freestyle skiers
Olympic freestyle skiers of the United States
Freestyle skiers at the 2002 Winter Olympics
21st-century American women